Sabina Cameron is a British actor who played Dr Ley in the soap opera Hollyoaks and who starred as in Tolu in Adura Onashile's play Expensive Shit.

Career 
Cameron played Dr Ley in British soap opera Hollyoaks. She starred as Tolu in Adura Onashile's play Expensive Shit where she is credited for her acting and dancing. She also appeared in the London production of Harry Potter and the Cursed Child.

See also 

 List of former Hollyoaks characters

References

External links 

 
 Sabina Cameron - Instagram
 Sabina Cameron - Twitter

Year of birth missing (living people)
Living people
Hollyoaks
British actors
British actresses